The Little River is a tidal channel connecting at each end with the Kennebec River in the town of Perkins in the U.S. state of Maine. It passes to the west of Little Swan Island while the main stem of the Kennebec passes to the east.

See also
List of rivers of Maine

References

Maine Streamflow Data from the USGS
Maine Watershed Data From Environmental Protection Agency

Tributaries of the Kennebec River
Rivers of Maine
Rivers of Sagadahoc County, Maine